Hector Catry (born 1889 in Ledeghem-lez-Courtrai) was a French clergyman and prelate for the Roman Catholic Archdiocese of Lahore. He was appointed bishop in 1928. He resigned in 1946, and died in 1972.

References 

1928 births
1972 deaths
French Roman Catholic bishops